Orthopsyllidae is a family of copepods belonging to the order Harpacticoida.

Genera:
 Orthopsyllus Brady & Robertson, 1873

References

Copepods